= Golif (artist) =

Austrian artist

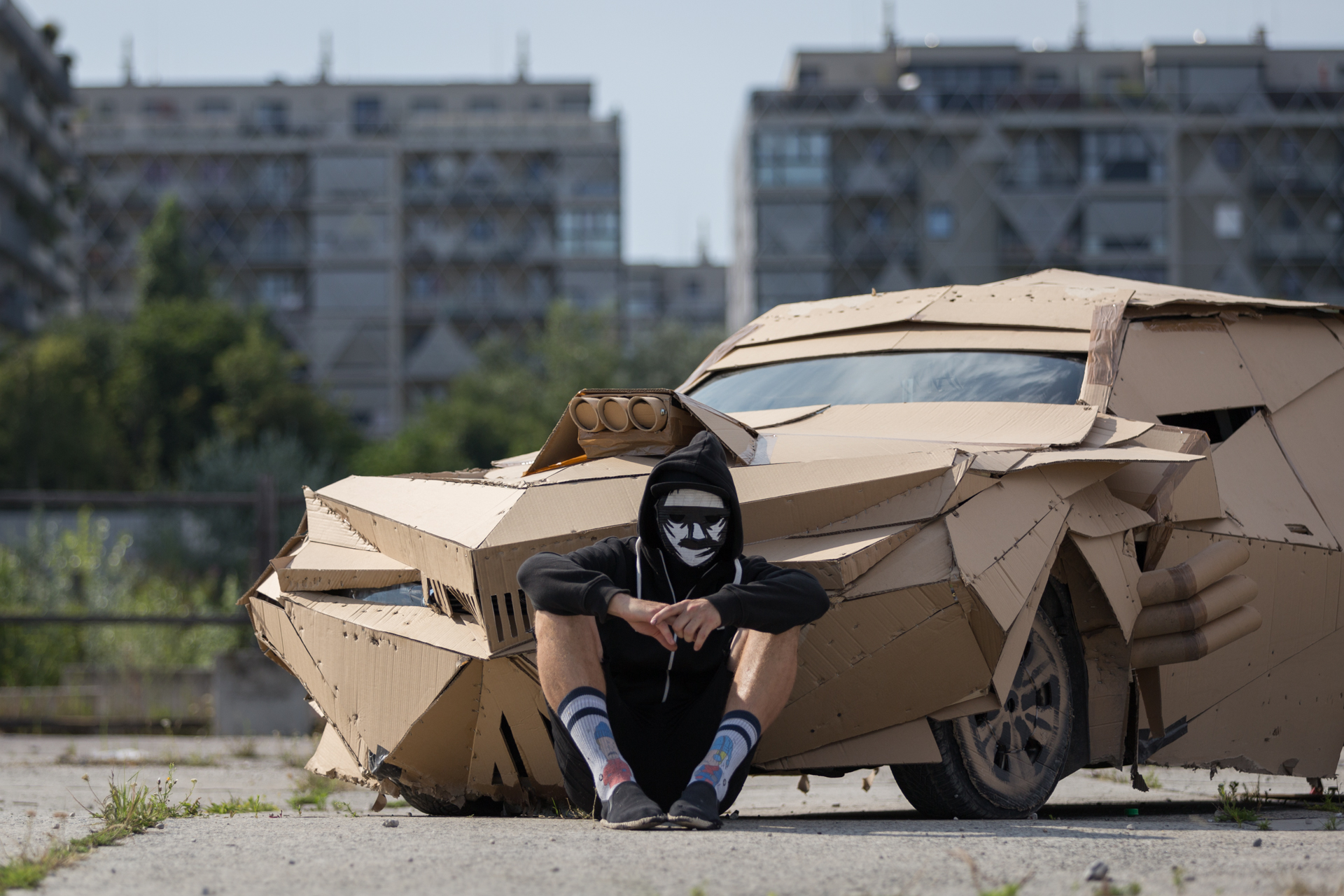
Golif while working on The Observer, 2015

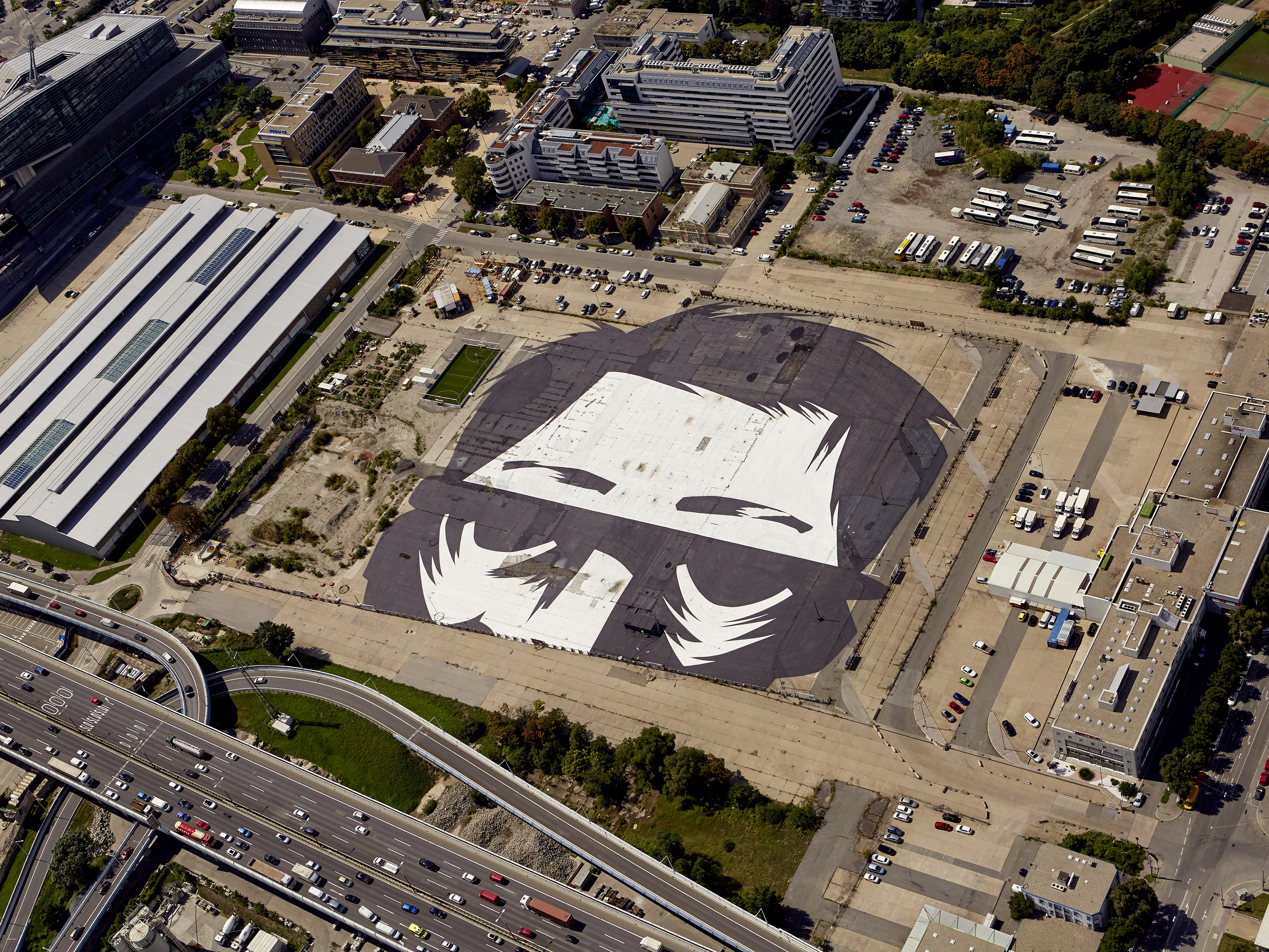
The Observer seen from the helicopter, 2016

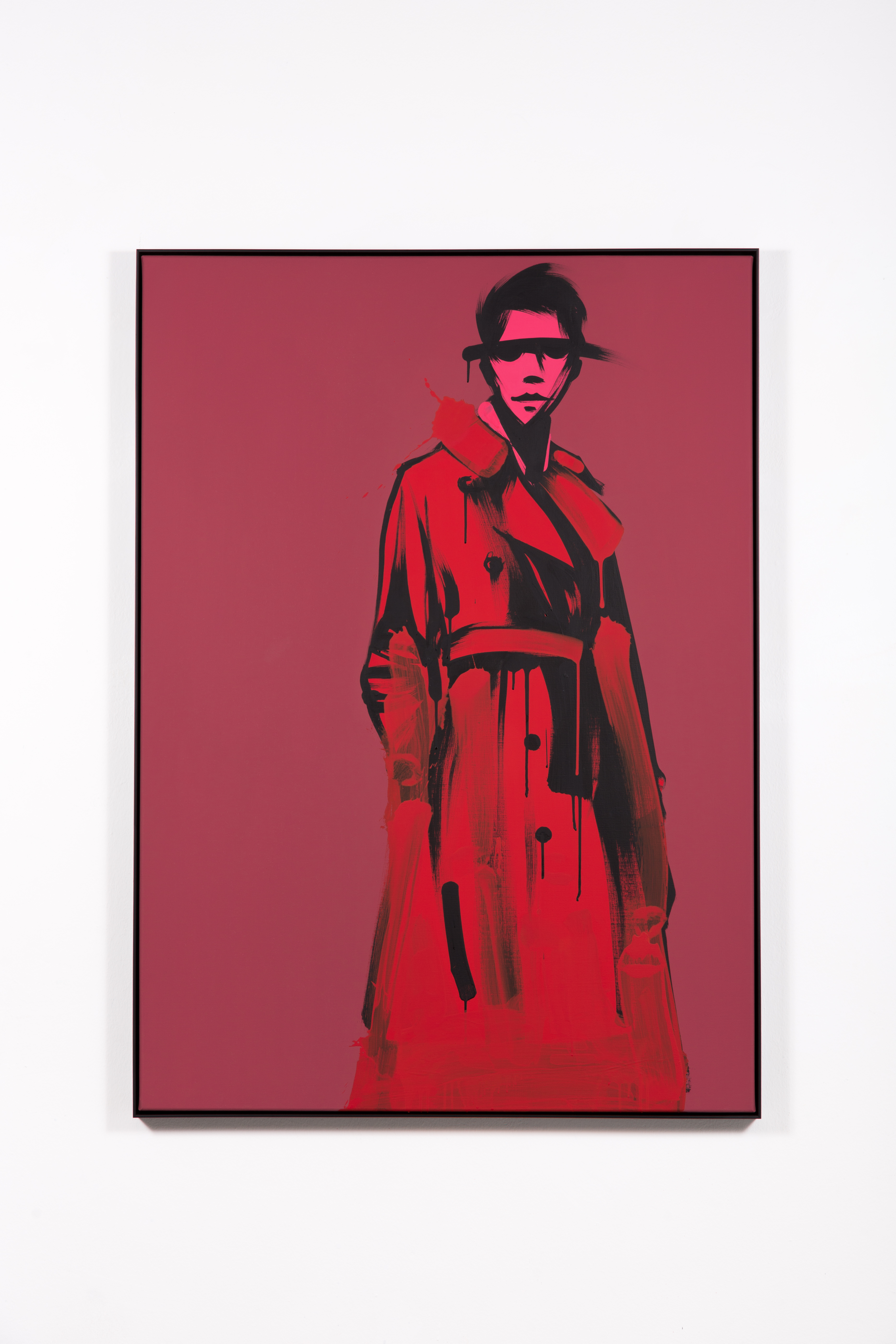
character, acrylic on canvas, around 2020

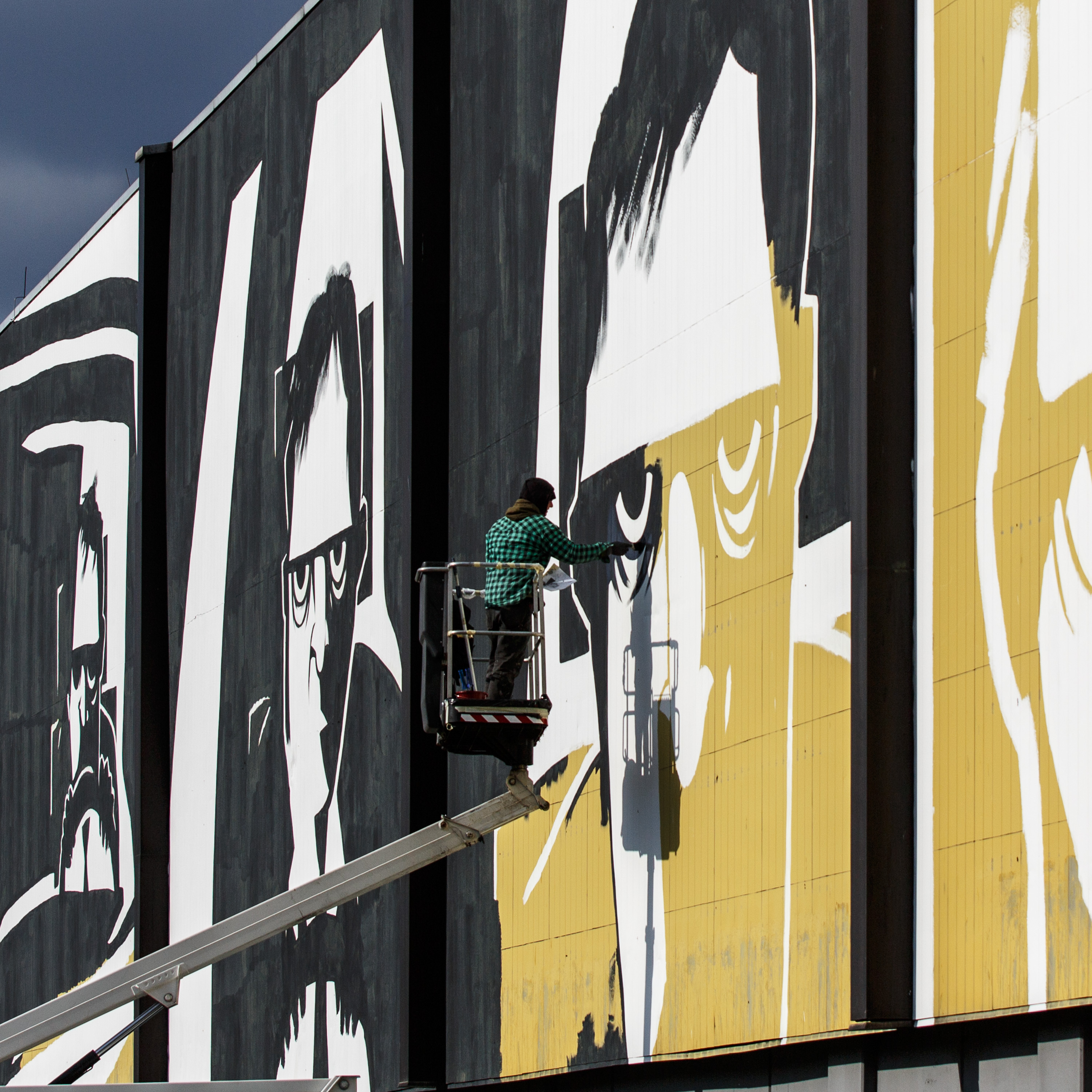
Golif at work at Anschützgasse, Vienna, Austria, 2015

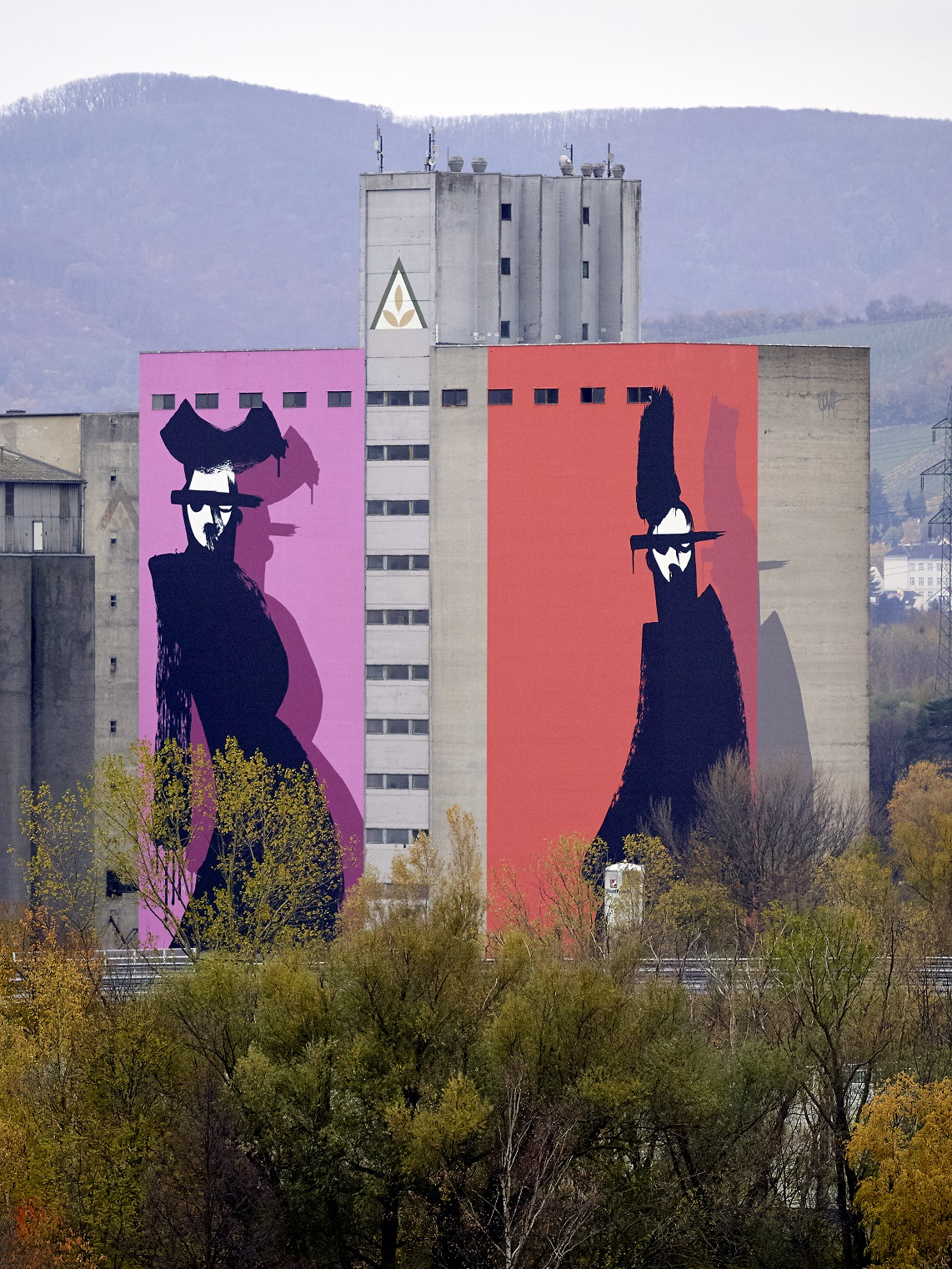
grain silo in Korneuburg, Austria 2017

Golif is an Austrian Vienna-based artist. He is a representative of Austrian street and urban art.

== Works ==
"The Observer", his most elaborate work so far can be found in Vienna. It's a ground piece implemented in 2016, covering an area the size of approximately six football fields. Golif used 5 tons of paint in the making. While on the scene only black and white areas of varying sizes appear, the sheer vastness of the piece renders it fully perceivable only from the sky.

A large scale evolution of his iconised figures can be found in a 2.500 m2 wall painting on an Agricultural storage unit in Korneuburg, Lower Austria. In 2017 Golif crafted two tall towering characters onto two sides of the concrete tower, built in the 1970s, characterizing the area of the surrounding landscape. In contrast to “The Observer” these figures are animated by their steadfastness and vivid colouring. Four weeks of labour and at least 1.5 tons of paint went into creating this piece. It can be seen from A22 highway.

Two further interventions with the public space can be found framing the Wiener Gürtel. In 2019 Golif created two murals, each covering 327 m2. Located on the edges of the 15. and 17. district the now colourful and eye-catching house walls interrupt the densely built on concrete masses of the area. Through their prominent placement the pieces are visible to all participants of the street- and city life.

Other notable Projects

- Anschützgasse, Vienna, 2015
- Rochusmarkt, Vienna, 2018
- Sonnenallee-Hermannplatz, Berlin, 2018
- Naschmarkt, Vienna, 2018
- Hörtnagelstrasse, Tyrol, 2019
- Aspern, Vienna, 2020
- Ottilie-Bondy-Promenade, Vienna, 2020
- Illustrations for the November issue of santementale.fr, 2020
- Breitenfurther Straße, Vienna, 2021.The object received the architecture award „gebaut 2021“
- “The giant of Santre” hotel project, Brixen, 2022

== Selected exhibitions ==
- 2014: Solo Exhibition, KMG Art Gallery/Vienna
- 2015: Solo Exhibition, Tojner Collection/Vienna
- 2015: Skulpturengarten Summerstage with Hans Kupelwieser/Vienna
- 2015: Young Art Auction by Sothebys in the Albertina/Vienna
- 2016: Goldenes Quartier/Vienna
- 2016: "Golif Observed", Solo Exhibition, KMG Art Gallery/Vienna
- 2017: Group Exhibition, E/AB Fair, The Tunnel/New York
- 2017: Creau Advent. Tag der Abschaffung der Sklaverei/Vienna
- 2018: Solo Exhibition, Galerie LeContainer/Nice
- 2018: "Street Dreams" Group Exhibition, Le Docks Village/Marseille
- 2018: Group Exhibition, Galerie LeContainer/St. Tropez
- 2018: "GOLIF", Loos Haus/Vienna
- 2018: Luxembourg Art Fair/Luxembourg
- 2018: St. Art/Strasbourg
- 2018: YIA Art Fair/Paris
- 2019: Antibes Art Fair/Antibes
- 2019: "GOLIF", KMG Art Gallery/Vienna
- 2019: "Take Over", Group Exhibition Wien Museum/Vienna
- 2019: "Golif Solo Show", Galerie LeContainer/Nice
- 2019: St. Art/Strasbourg
- 2020: Installation at Thiem's Seven tennis tournament/Kitzbühel
- 2021: "SOLO Show", Take a Butcher's Gallery/Düsseldorf
- 2021: "In Situ", Galerie LeContainer /Aix-en-Provence
- 2022: "Finding Forte", Group Exhibition, designforum Wien/Vienna
- 2023: Millstart, festival for contemporary art, Millstatt, Austria
- 2023: GOLIF x Hamburg – Solo Show, URBANSHIT GALLERY, Hamburg
